Kalikumarapuram alias KKPuram is a beautiful village situated on Tiruchendur - Kanyakumari East Cost Road Thisayanvilai taluk, Tirunelveli district, Tamil Nadu .

There are 100 houses, around 450 people live here. Around 50 percent of people migrate to various places of Tamil Nadu and other part of India due to their job, business or survival.

This village is located 700 metres from the beach. There are many available natural and mineral resources, especially thorium plutonium, in this area.
This village peoples all were well educated. Many of these people are employed in major companies in India and abroad. Also some girls and ladies beedi making work under some companies.

This village boys play many games such as cricket, volleyball, football, carrom, bambaram, goli, kuchi kattai (gilly), nondi, kasa pusa, hide and seek, etc. This village has its own cricket team named "The Great Boys". They have won many games against nearest village tournaments. This village has longest beach and forest. And this village has a government primary school. This village people never support political parties. For that reason in this village there are no political flags not available.

Early History
A group of warriors from Travancore (Pandiya kingdom) migrated via Indian Ocean, Bay of Bengal sea shore to KaliKumaraPuram  after a war. They landed in the sea shore and made a settlement. Nearly 1850s they started cultivating crops like chilly, onion, cereals by digging a number of wells only 400 meters away from sea. Then they built a temple under a vanni tree called "vanniadi peamarumal kovil". The civilization grown and Kalikumarapuram emerged. This village also has the Sri Mutharamman temple, this temple has a historic style, and an old Neem tree.

Gram Panchayat

Village  : KaliKumaraPuram (KKPuram)
President: P. Chinnathambi Nadar 
Panchayat: Karaichuttu Navvalady
Taluk    : Thisyanvilai
District : Tirunelveli

Gram Panchayat
Temples: 
Sri Mutharamman Temple
Sri Vanniadi Perumal Temple
Sri Mannar Raja Temple
Sri Issakki Amman Temple

Key Facilities
Vasaga saalai 2 (community building , library)
School
Post Office
Bus Stop
Water Tank for every 4 houses
Drinking water pipe line to individual house
Auditorium 
Sea shore

Village Details
Number of houses    : 100 
Number of residents : 450 
Petty shop          : 3 
Local Transport     : State corporation buses and mini buses limited

Key People (based on individual/family welfare to village)
1960-1980 
S Subramanian Nadar (Mani Nadar) - whose family has given land to school, school ground
S M Periyasamy Nadar - who brought Post office to village 

1984-2018 
S M P Chinnathambi Nadar - 
- Approval for primary school
- Water pipeline to village, pipe line individual home when he served as panchayat member, panchayat president
- Helped to brought Govt schemes(concrete house Pradhan Mantri Awas Yojana, concrete road to villege street etc.) 
- Auditorium

Note: Common welfare specific achievements alone added

References 

Villages in Tirunelveli district